The 1995 London Marathon was the 15th running of the annual marathon race in London, United Kingdom, which took place on Sunday, 2 April. The elite men's race was won by Mexico's Dionicio Cerón, who took his second straight title in a time of 2:08:30 hours, and the women's race was won by Poland's Małgorzata Sobańska in 2:27:43. 

In the wheelchair races, Switzerland's Heinz Frei (1:39:14) and Britain's Rose Hill  (2:17:02) won the men's and women's divisions, respectively. Frei's winning time was a course record and the first sub-1:40 finish at the race.

Around 79,000 people applied to enter the race, of which 39,097 had their applications accepted and around 27,000 started the race. A total of 25,377 runners finished the race.

Results

Men

Women

Wheelchair men

Wheelchair women

References

Results
Results. Association of Road Racing Statisticians. Retrieved 2020-04-19.

External links

Official website

1995
London Marathon
Marathon
London Marathon